Elgin is a suburb of Gisborne, in the Gisborne District of New Zealand's North Island. It is located east and north of Awapuni, south of Te Hapara and west of Gisborne Central.

Demographics

Elgin had a population of 2,583 at the 2018 New Zealand census, an increase of 288 people (12.5%) since the 2013 census, and an increase of 282 people (12.3%) since the 2006 census. There were 843 households, comprising 1,287 males and 1,296 females, giving a sex ratio of 0.99 males per female. The median age was 31.0 years (compared with 37.4 years nationally), with 660 people (25.6%) aged under 15 years, 597 (23.1%) aged 15 to 29, 1,008 (39.0%) aged 30 to 64, and 318 (12.3%) aged 65 or older.

Ethnicities were 40.0% European/Pākehā, 69.0% Māori, 8.9% Pacific peoples, 2.2% Asian, and 1.3% other ethnicities. People may identify with more than one ethnicity.

The percentage of people born overseas was 6.2, compared with 27.1% nationally.

Although some people chose not to answer the census's question about religious affiliation, 48.5% had no religion, 34.6% were Christian, 6.5% had Māori religious beliefs, 0.2% were Hindu, 0.1% were Buddhist and 1.4% had other religions.

Of those at least 15 years old, 135 (7.0%) people had a bachelor's or higher degree, and 528 (27.5%) people had no formal qualifications. The median income was $22,100, compared with $31,800 nationally. 90 people (4.7%) earned over $70,000 compared to 17.2% nationally. The employment status of those at least 15 was that 861 (44.8%) people were employed full-time, 267 (13.9%) were part-time, and 156 (8.1%) were unemployed.

Parks

The Reynolds Creek Reserve and Sandown Park is a local park which allows dogs on leashes.

Education

Both schools are co-educational. Rolls are as of

References

Suburbs of Gisborne, New Zealand